Daniel Prada (born 23 February 1993) is an Argentine professional footballer who plays as a midfielder for Los Andes.

Career
Prada started in the youth ranks of Sportivo Italiano, prior to having periods in the academies of Boca Juniors, All Boys and Atlanta. Prada began his senior career in Swiss football with FC Locarno, which was followed by spells in Italy with Trezzano and in Spain with Llagostera. In 2014, after a stint with Fundación Leo Messi, Prada moved to Spanish outfit Mazagón. Later that year, Prada joined Primera Andaluza side San Roque. His debut arrived in a win away to his ex-club Mazagón in September, on the way to nineteen total appearances. Prada moved across the division for the 2015–16 campaign, signing for Atlético Benamiel.

After featuring twenty times for Atlético Benamiel, Prada switched Spain for a return to Italy having agreed terms with Marsala in 2016. On 25 January 2017, Prada joined Segunda División B side Eldense. He appeared against Ebro on 29 January, but was released soon after. Prada headed back to his homeland later that year to join Sacachispas, though didn't appear competitively despite remaining until June 2018. Deportivo Morón became Prada's eleventh senior club on 3 July. His bow came in a Primera B Nacional fixture with Los Andes in the succeeding April. In summer 2019, Prada joined San Miguel.

In early 2020, Parada moved back to Italian football with Eccellenza Basilicata club ASD Policoro. On 22 December 2020, Prada signed with Primera B Metropolitana team Los Andes in Argentina.

Career statistics
.

References

External links

1993 births
Living people
Footballers from Buenos Aires
Argentine footballers
Association football midfielders
Argentine expatriate footballers
Expatriate footballers in Switzerland
Expatriate footballers in Italy
Expatriate footballers in Spain
Argentine expatriate sportspeople in Switzerland
Argentine expatriate sportspeople in Italy
Argentine expatriate sportspeople in Spain
Primera Andaluza players
Segunda División B players
Primera Nacional players
FC Locarno players
A.S.D. Trezzano Calcio players
UE Costa Brava players
CD San Roque de Lepe footballers
S.S.D. Marsala Calcio players
CD Eldense footballers
Sacachispas Fútbol Club players
Deportivo Morón footballers
Club Atlético San Miguel footballers
Club Atlético Los Andes footballers